Indonesia participated in the 2005 Southeast Asian Games held in multiple venues in the Philippines from November 27, 2005 to December 5, 2005. The chief of mission to the games was Joko Pramono.

See also
 2005 Southeast Asian Games
 Indonesia

2005 in Indonesian sport
2005
Nations at the 2005 Southeast Asian Games